Yuri Valeryevich Petrakov (born 27 January 1991) is a Russian former football midfielder.

Club career
He spent some time on the roster of four different Russian Premier League teams from Moscow without playing a single game for the senior squad.

He made his debut in the Russian Football National League for FC Dynamo Bryansk on 9 August 2011 in a game against FC Fakel Voronezh.

Personal life
He is a son of Valeriy Petrakov, who was playing in Sweden with IFK Luleå when Yuri was born.

References

1991 births
People from Luleå
Living people
Russian footballers
Russia youth international footballers
Association football midfielders
FC Dynamo Moscow reserves players
FC Tom Tomsk players
FC Torpedo Moscow players
FC Luch Vladivostok players
PFC CSKA Moscow players
FC Znamya Truda Orekhovo-Zuyevo players
FC Moscow players
FC Khimik Dzerzhinsk players
FC Dynamo Bryansk players